"The Return of Pan" is a song from Scottish-Irish folk rock band the Waterboys, which was released as the lead single from their sixth studio album Dream Harder. It was written by Mike Scott, and produced by Scott and Bill Price. The song reached No. 24 in the UK Singles Chart and No. 10 on the US Billboard Modern Rock Tracks chart.

Background
"The Return of Pan" is the Waterboys' second ode to the Greek deity, following "The Pan Within" from 1985's This Is the Sea. In 1996, Scott described the song as "mischievous".

Music video
The song's music video was directed by Jeff Stein and features Carla Azar on drums. It was the Waterboys' first video since 1985's "The Whole of the Moon" and Scott's debut video for Geffen Records. Scott had previously refused to shoot videos for most of the Waterboys' singles. He considered the medium to taint the listener's relationship with a song and spoil their imagination of it by presenting imagery that was often "shallow and moronic". By 1993, he decided to give making videos a try again to maximise the potential of the new material reaching a big audience.

Prior to shooting any video for Geffen, Scott received some training from the acting teacher and theatre director Stephen Jobes on how to present himself in front of a camera and remain composed in front of a film crew. Meanwhile, a number of directors drew up their ideas for videos for "The Return of Pan", but Scott rejected all of the ideas for either being clichéd or misinterpreting the song. Geffen eventually suggested the director Jeff Stein and after Scott met him in a coffee shop along Sixth Avenue, he agreed for him to direct the video for "The Return of Pan".

Scott wished to control the vision for the video to "ensure [it] conformed to my sense of the song" and did not misinterpret it with an "irrelevant storyline". Stein obliged with Scott's suggestion of a performance-based video with Scott sitting down performing the song with a gold guitar, the concept of which was based on a photograph taken for the Dream Harder sleeve. Scott also suggested featuring some goats in the video, but the resulting footage presented them as "goofy, like wacky pets at a children's zoo" rather than "wild and Pan-like". The final sequence, featuring Scott surrounded by goats and with his guitar raised over his head, was shot at The Palisades of the lower Hudson River. Scott recalled in his autobiography of seeing the final result, "I realised the folly of controlling the content myself; though the video was well shot by Jeff it was stiff and kooky, a thousand miles from the intent of the song".

Critical reception
On its release, Larry Flick of Billboard described the song as a "tough, well-produced track that neatly balances raucous electric guitars with the Celtic folk the band has long made a specialty". Randy Clark of Cash Box wrote, "This single from the upcoming Waterboys album could have just as easily appeared on an Al Stewart record. Just add a bigger beat and a lengthy, screaming guitar solo." In a review of Dream Harder, CD Review commented, "'The Return of Pan' finds [Scott] singing about mythological gods and although romanticism is neat stuff, it's most effective when shaded with a touch of reality." Audio noted the song "point[s] to Scott's fondness for other kinds of supreme beings".

Formats

Personnel
 Mike Scott – vocals, lead guitar, rhythm guitar, keyboard, percussion
 Chris Bruce – lead guitar, rhythm guitar
 Scott Thunes – bass
 Carla Azar – drums
 George Stathos – Greek clarinet on "The Return of Pan"
 Sugar Blue – harmonica on "Karma"

Production
 Mike Scott – producer of "The Return of Pan", "Karma" and "Mister Powers"
 Bill Price – producer, recording and mixing on "The Return of Pan" and "Karma"
 Niko Bolas – recording and mixing on "Mister Powers"

Other
 Matt Mahurin – illustration
 Frank Olinsky – art direction

Charts

References

The Waterboys songs
1993 songs
1993 singles
Geffen Records singles
Songs written by Mike Scott (musician)
Song recordings produced by Mike Scott (musician)